A penumbral lunar eclipse took place on Monday, October 18, 1948. It was a relatively rare total penumbral lunar eclipse where the moon passes entirely within the penumbral shadow, but not at all in the darker umbral shadow. In a rare total penumbral eclipse, the entire Moon was partially shaded by the Earth (though none of it was in complete shadow), and the shading across the Moon should have been quite visible at maximum eclipse. The penumbral phase lasted for 4 hours and 40 minutes in all, though for most of it, the eclipse was extremely difficult or impossible to see.

Visibility

Related lunar eclipses

Lunar year series

Half-Saros cycle
A lunar eclipse will be preceded and followed by solar eclipses by 9 years and 5.5 days (a half saros). This lunar eclipse is related to two total solar eclipses of Solar Saros 123.

See also
List of lunar eclipses
List of 20th-century lunar eclipses

Notes

External links

1948-10
1948 in science